The Nürnberg Ice Tigers are a professional ice hockey club located in Nuremberg, Germany. They play in the country's premier league, the Deutsche Eishockey Liga.

History
The roots of the team can be traced back to SG Nürnberg, an ice hockey club that played in the 2nd Bundesliga from 1958 until it was closed in 1980 due to financial issues. Today's team was founded in 1980 as EHC Nürnberg 1980 e.V., as a non-profit organization. Play started in 1980–81 in the Bavarian state ice-hockey league. After a single season, the team moved up to the Southern Regional league, and was promoted again after just one season in 1983 to the 3rd tier German Ice Hockey league.

By 1987, EHC Nürnberg 1980 moved up to the 2nd Bundesliga. In the early 1990s, financial uncertainty around German professional ice-hockey lead to the foundation of the Deutsche Eishockey Liga – DEL. The DEL was modeled after the NHL, with hopes of providing financial stability through licensing and franchising of teams.

EHC Nürnberg 1980 was admitted to the DEL as a founding member on 13 June 1994, one of 6 teams from the 2nd Bundesliga. As the DEL replaced the 1st Bundesliga and now represents the highest level of German professional ice-hockey, this in effect resulted in a promotion. In the first DEL season, the EHC 80 Nürnberg finished the regular season on the 12th place, only to be eliminated in the first playoff round.

For the next season, the professional team was broken out of the non-profit organization and incorporated as the Nürnberg Ice Tigers, with the youth and amateurs keeping the old name. In the 1998–99 DEL season the Tigers finished the regular season in first place, but lost in the playoff finals to the Adler Mannheim, who dominated German Ice Hockey in the late 1990s.

In 2006, the Ice Tigers and Bionorica AG, signed a three-year agreement giving Bionorica the naming rights to the team. Starting with the 2006–07 DEL season, the team was renamed to Sinupret Ice Tigers, after a Bionorica product.

During the 2008–09 season it became obvious that the Ice Tigers were in a dire financial situation. On 25 November 2008 preliminary insolvency was filed and, on 30 December, declared. This led to the corporate sponsor Bionorica pulling their support in March 2009. An investor group led by local jeweler Thomas Sabo intervened on 3 April 2009, pre-empting bankruptcy proceedings and ensuring participation in the 2009–10 season. The team was known as the Thomas Sabo Ice Tigers for eleven years until April 2020. Once the sponsorship by Thomas Sabo ended, the team changed its name back to Nürnberg Ice Tigers.

Logos

Players and personnel

Current roster

Head coaches

Jozef Golonka, 1994–95
Jan Eysselt, 1995–97
Vladimir Vasiliev, 1997–98
Peter Ihnačák, 1998–00
Bob Murdoch, 2000–02
Mike Schmidt, 2002–03
Greg Poss, 2003–05
Benoît Laporte, 2005–08
Andreas Brockmann, 2008–12
Bengt-Åke Gustafsson, 2012–13
Tray Tuomie, 2013–14
Martin Jiranek, 2014
Rob Wilson, 2015–18
Kevin Gaudet, 2018
Martin Jiranek, 2018–19
Kurt Kleinendorst, 2019–20
Frank Fischöder, 2020–21
Tom Rowe, 2021–present

All-time records
 The most DEL games for the club: 524 Patrick Reimer
 The most DEL goals for the club: 218 Patrick Reimer
 The most DEL penalty minutes for the club: 576 John Craighead

References

External links
Official website

Ice hockey teams in Germany
Ice hockey clubs established in 1980
Thomas Sabo Ice Tigers
Sport in Nuremberg
1980 establishments in West Germany
Ice hockey teams in Bavaria